Charlotte High School may refer to:

Port Charlotte High School, Port Charlotte, Florida
Charlotte High School (Punta Gorda, Florida), Punta Gorda, Florida
Charlotte High School (Michigan), Charlotte, Michigan
Charlotte High School (Rochester, New York), Rochester, New York
Charlotte High School (now Garinger High School), Charlotte, North Carolina
Charlotte High School (Texas)